Lee Michaels is the third album by Lee Michaels and was released in 1969.  It reached #53 on the Billboard Top LPs chart.  The album was recorded live in studio with only Michaels playing the organ and bass pedals and Barry "Frosty" Smith on drums.  The first side (tracks 1-5) consists of a medley of songs.  The song "My Friends" was originally featured on his first album, Carnival of Life and was re-released on this album.

The album featured the single "Heighty Hi" which reached #106 on the Billboard single's chart.

Track listing
All songs written by Lee Michaels except where noted.
 "Tell Me How Do You Feel" (Percy Mayfield/Ray Charles) – 20:28
 "(Don't Want No) Woman"
 "My Friends"
 "Frosty's" (Barry "Frosty" Smith)
 "Think I'll Go Back"
 "Stormy Monday" (T-Bone Walker) – 5:10
 "Who Could Want More" – 3:42
 "Want My Baby" – 2:58
 "Heighty Hi" – 5:57

Personnel

Musicians
 Lee Michaels – lead vocals, organ, bass
 Barry "Frosty" Smith – percussion

Technical
 Larry Marks – producer
 Tom Wilkes – art direction
 Jim McCrary – photography (front cover)
 Robert Black – photography (back cover)

Charts

Singles

References

1969 albums
Lee Michaels albums
A&M Records albums